Jessica Hecht is an American actress and singer known for her roles as Gretchen Schwartz on Breaking Bad, Susan Bunch on Friends, Carol on The Boys, and Karen on Special. She has also made numerous Broadway appearances.

Early life and education
Hecht was born in Princeton, New Jersey. When she was three, she moved with her parents and sister to Bloomfield, Connecticut. After her parents divorced, her mother married psychiatrist Howard Iger, and they raised Jessica and her sister Elizabeth. Hecht attended Connecticut College for a year and a half before graduating from the New York University Tisch School of the Arts in 1987 with a Bachelor of Fine Arts in drama.

Hecht was raised in a culturally Jewish family, with a secular socialist father, but nonetheless expressed interest in religion and had a Bat Mitzvah. She has stated that she is Reconstructionist Jewish and "fairly spiritual".

Career
Hecht has appeared in numerous television series, including Dickinson, Bored to Death, Red Oaks, Jessica Jones, The Loudest Voice, and Succession. In 2020 she played Sonya Barzel on The Sinner, and was nominated for an Emmy in 2019 for her role as Karen in the Netflix series Special. She is known for her roles as Gretchen Schwartz on Breaking Bad (5 episodes) and Susan Bunch, the wife of Ross Geller's ex-wife Carol Willick, on Friends (12 episodes). She was also a featured cast member in the Jonathan Silverman sitcom The Single Guy.

Hecht had the supporting role of Amy Burns in the comedy drama Dan in Real Life (2007), with Steve Carell and Juliette Binoche. She also appeared in Whatever Works, Sideways, and A Beautiful Day in the Neighborhood.

She was nominated for a Tony Award for Best Featured Actress for her role in A View from the Bridge on Broadway with Scarlett Johansson and Liev Schreiber, which closed on April 4, 2010. In 2012, she performed on Broadway with Jim Parsons in Harvey. In 2016, she played Golde in the 2015 Bartlett Sher-directed revival of Fiddler on the Roof at the Broadway Theatre, and was in The Price with Mark Ruffalo, in 2017. In 2018 she won an Obie for her performance in Admissions at Lincoln Center. 

With producer Jenny Gersten, she runs The Campfire Project, a theatre based wellness project that creates plays in refugee camps.

Personal life
Hecht has been married to director Adam Bernstein since 1995. The couple has two children together, Stella and Carlo Bernstein.

Filmography

Film

Television

Video games

Theatre roles

References

External links

Living people
20th-century American actresses
21st-century American actresses
Actresses from New Jersey
American film actresses
American television actresses
Jewish American actresses
People from Princeton, New Jersey
Tisch School of the Arts alumni
American stage actresses
Connecticut College alumni
Year of birth missing (living people)
American Reconstructionist Jews